The Summit is a highrise condominium tower developed by Joseph Eichler, located near the top of the upscale Russian Hill in San Francisco, California, at 999 Green Street. The tower was designed by Niell Smith and Associates. Above ground, it has 4 floors of parking and 25 floors of residential condominiums. The tower was completed in 1965. This residential tower is featured in Sean Wilsey's book Oh the Glory of It All as well as "Significant Others" and "Sure of You" by Armistead Maupin.

Residents include former Secretary of State George Shultz and his wife, San Francisco's chief of protocol, Charlotte Smith Mailliard Swig Shultz.. Another famous resident, Chuck Williams of Williams-Sonoma.

See also
List of tallest buildings in San Francisco

References

Residential buildings completed in 1965
Russian Hill, San Francisco
Residential skyscrapers in San Francisco